Vochysia aurifera is a species of plant in the Vochysiaceae family. It is endemic to Honduras, in Central America.

References

Vochysiaceae
Endemic flora of Honduras
Critically endangered flora of North America
Taxonomy articles created by Polbot